The Roman Catholic Diocese of Kikwit is a diocese located in the city of Kikwit  in the Ecclesiastical province of Kinshasa in the Democratic Republic of the Congo.

History 
 Established in 1893 as Mission sui iuris of Kwango (or Koango), on territory split off from the then Apostolic Vicariate of Léopoldville
 Promoted on 31 January 1903 as Apostolic Prefecture of Kwango
 Promoted on 28 March 1928 to Apostolic Vicariate of Kwango, hence entitled to a titular bishop
 Lost territory repeatedly: to establish the Apostolic Vicariate of Kisantu on 1931.04.01, and on 1935.01.28 more territory to the same; on 1937.04.13 to establish the Apostolic Prefecture of Ipamu and more on 1939.04.25 to the same
 Renamed on 21 February 1955 as Apostolic Vicariate of Kikwit
 Lost territory on 1957.07.05 to establish the Apostolic Prefecture of Kenge
 Promoted on 10 November 1959 as Diocese of Kikwit

Bishops 
(all Roman rite, mostly missionary members of Latin congregations)

Ordinaries
 Ecclesiastical superiors of the mission sui iuris of Kwango (Koango)
(not available -- 1893-1903)

 Apostolic Prefects of Kwango  
 Julien Banckaert (1903 – 1911)
 Stanislas de Vos, Society of Jesus (S.J.) (1911 – 1928)

 Apostolic Vicars of Kwango  
 Silvain van Hee, S.J. (1928.03.28 – 1936.02.20), Titular Bishop of Possala (1928.03.28 – 1960.03.26)
 Enrico van Schingen, S.J. (1936.12.17 – 1954.07.02), Titular Bishop of Phelbes (1936.12.17 – 1954.07.02)

 Apostolic Vicar of Kikwit 
 André Lefèbvre, S.J. (1955.02.25 – 1959.11.10 see below), Titular Bishop of Raphanea (1955.02.25 – 1959.11.10)

 Bishops of Kikwit 
 André Lefèbvre, S.J. (see above 1959.11.10 – 1967.11.29), later Titular Bishop of Thucca Terebenthina (1967.11.29 – 1976.09.15)
 Alexander Mbuka-Nzundu (1967.11.29 – 1985.10.14), previously Titular Bishop of Cataquas & 
Auxiliary Bishop of Kikwit (1961.06.24 – 1967.11.29)
 Édouard Mununu Kasiala, Trappists (O.C.S.O.) (1986.03.10 - 2016.11.19), also Apostolic Administrator of Popokabaka (Congo-Kinshasa) (1991 – 1996.04.22); previously Titular Bishop of Aquæ Flaviæ & Auxiliary Bishop of Kikwit (1984.11.08 – 1986.03.10)
 Timothée Bodika Mansiyai, P.S.S. (2016.11.19 - )

Coadjutor vicars apostolic
Charles Dauvin, S.J. (1948), died without being consecrated
Joseph Guffens, S.J. (1949-1954)

Auxiliary bishops
Alexander Mbuka-Nzundu (1961-1967), appointed Bishop here
Edouard Mununu Kasiala, O.C.S.O. (1984-1986), appointed Bishop here

See also 
 Roman Catholicism in the Democratic Republic of the Congo

Sources and external links

 GCatholic.org, with incumbent biography links
 Catholic Hierarchy

Kikwit
Roman Catholic dioceses in the Democratic Republic of the Congo
Religious organizations established in 1893
Roman Catholic dioceses and prelatures established in the 19th century
Roman Catholic Ecclesiastical Province of Kinshasa
Roman Catholic bishops of Kikwit